Limonium bellidifolium, commonly known as the matted sea-lavender, is an aggregate species in the family Plumbaginaceae.

Despite the common name, matted sea-lavender is not related to the lavenders, but is a perennial herb with flowers with five petals in clusters. It occurs in the upper saltmarshes of Europe and southwest Asia and grows up to  30 cm tall from a rhizome.

References

bellidifolium
Halophytes
Plants described in 1764